The men's basketball tournament at the 1959 Pan American Games was held from August 27 to September 6, 1959 in Chicago, United States.

Men's competition

Participating nations

Final ranking

Awards

Women's competition

Participating nations

Final ranking

Awards

References
 Results
 basketpedya

1959
Events at the 1959 Pan American Games
Pan American Games
Pan American Games
Pan American Games
1959 Pan American Games
1959 Pan American Games